Mogielnica  is a town in Grójec County in Masovian Voivodeship, Poland, with 2,475 inhabitants (2004) and an area of 141.56 square kilometres (54.7 sq mi). It is the seat of Gmina Mogielnica (urban-rural gmina administrative unit). In other languages, it is referred to as Mogelnitsa, Mogelnitse, Mogelnitza and/or Mogielnicy.

Modern history

In World War I, the Tsarist regime, in reprisal for its own catastrophic failures in battle with Germany, expelled the Jews of Mogielnica. The Jewish paper, Haynt, published in Congress Poland, stated in its May 23, 1915 issue (under Russian military censorship): "The entire Jewish population was deported from Mogielnica, roughly 5,000 people. They were given a short period of time in which to liquidate their businesses." Some of the Jews returned to Mogielnica once Poland re-emerged as a sovereign state.

World War II
In 1940, during the Nazi Occupation of Poland, German authorities established a ghetto in Mogielnica to confine, persecute and exploit its Jewish population. From there, most victims were sent to the Treblinka extermination camp. The Nazis demolished the 18th-century Jewish cemetery located on the left side of the road to Grójec, near Przylesie Street, and used its headstones for pavement. A monument now stands in its place.

Historical population of Mogielnica

Notes and references

External links

 Mogielnica official website.  
 Mogielnica Family Research Group
 Jewish Community in Mogielnica on Virtual Shtetl

Cities and towns in Masovian Voivodeship
Grójec County
Warsaw Governorate
Warsaw Voivodeship (1919–1939)
Holocaust locations in Poland